The London Senior Cup is the County Senior Cup of the London FA.  The London Senior Cup was first won by Upton Park in 1882. Although the leading professional sides in London no longer compete, the Cup has been won in the past by the likes of Arsenal (as Royal Arsenal in 1891), Brentford, Wimbledon and Barnet. The current champions are the development squad of Premier League club Brentford, Brentford B.

Finals

Titles by team

References

External links
The Official Website of the London Football Association

County Cup competitions
Recurring events established in 1882
Football competitions in London
1882 establishments in England